"For You" is a song by Japanese-American musician Hikaru Utada. It was released as a double A-side single with the song "Time Limit" on June 30, 2000.

Background and development 
In 1999, Utada released their debut album First Love, which was the most commercially successful album of all time in Japan. After this success, they released two follow-up singles, "Addicted to You" (1999) and "Wait & See (Risk)" (2000), which were both produced by American production team Jimmy Jam and Terry Lewis. "For You" was a continuation of Utada's collaboration with arranger Kei Kawano, who had previously worked with Utada on First Love (1999) (including the single "First Love") and the coupling tracks on their single "Wait & See (Risk)". The song was recorded at Toshiba EMI's Studio Terra in Tokyo.

The "For You" / "Time Limit" single was released right before Bohemian Summer 2000, their first wide-scale tour of Japan, and on the same day as the DVD single release of their previous single, "Wait & See (Risk)".

Promotion and release 
The song was first unveiled on June 19, 2000, when a 60-second preview of "For You" was previewed on Japan FM Network radio stations, a week after "Time Limit" was previewed. To promote the single, Utada appeared in magazines released in June and July, such as Pati Pati, What's In?, Pia, Tokyo Walker and Popteen. On June 23, 2000, Utada performed the song live at Music Station, and on the June 29 episode of Utaban performed both "For You" and "Time Limit".

Music video 
A music video was created for the song, featuring footage from their secret live performance at the Shibuya On Air East on June 26, 2000, just before the start of their Bohemian Summer 2000 tour.

Covers 
In 2014, singer Miliyah Kato recorded "For You" for Utada Hikaru no Uta, a tribute album celebrating 15 years since Utada's debut. The cover sampled the original recording of the song by Utada, and also incorporated "Give Me a Reason" from Utada's debut album First Love (1999).

Critical reception 
Sato of OngakuDB.com felt that "For You" explored solitude similar to Osamu Dazai's 1948 novel No Longer Human, however expressed this in the "direct words of a 17 year old" instead of "spitting out the words of an adult". CDJournal reviewers felt that the song "[did not] have an instantly gripping sound and doesn't feel like something flat out, but their Japanese-style taste moves the bottom line with their heavy kicks and expert harmonies." The reviewers further remarked that the song had Utada's signature vocal sound and a high level of perfection.

The "For You" / "Time Limit" single was successful enough to win a Song of the Year award at the 15th Japan Gold Disc Awards.

Track listing

Personnel 
Personnel details were sourced from "For You/Time Limit"'s liner notes booklet.

Goh Hotoda – mixing
Takahiro Iida – synthesizer programming
Kei Kawano – arrangement, all keyboards, electric guitar, programming
Akira Miyake – production
Hidenobu Okita – talking modulator
Masaaki Ugajin – recording, tape scratch
Hikaru Utada – all vocals, writing
Teruzane "Sking" Utada – production

Charts

Sales and certifications

Release history

References 

2000 songs
2000 singles
Hikaru Utada songs
Japanese-language songs
Oricon Weekly number-one singles
Songs written by Hikaru Utada